Kamsale Kaisale (ಕಂಸಾಳೆ ಕೈಸಾಳೆ) is a 2012 Kannada language children's film directed by T. S. Nagabharana.

Cast 
 Master Snehith as Madhav
 Master Vasuki Vaibhav
 Sridhar
 T. S. Nagabharana as Ranganatha 
 Deeraj r
 Shanthamma
 Amulya

Reception

Critical response 

B S Srivani from Deccan Herald wrote "Another hero of the film is cinematographer Anant Urs whose camera brings alive Mahadeshwara Betta, Biligiri Rangana Betta and surrounding areas. The climax seems abrupt but the entire journey more than makes up for the disappointment". A critic from Bangalore Mirror wrote  "While Ananth Urs’s cinematography adds colour to the film, songs continue to lull in your ears even after coming out of theatre".

Awards and nominations 

The film won the Karnataka State Film Award for Best Children Film. 
Snehith was nominated at the Bangalore Times Film Awards for the Best Child Artist.

References 

2010s Kannada-language films
Films directed by T. S. Nagabharana